Nenad Filipović may refer to:

 Nenad Filipović (racewalker) (born 1978), Serbian racewalker
 Nenad Filipović (footballer) (born 1987), Serbian footballer